Hans Gren (born 2 October 1957) is a Swedish football manager who is currently manager of Östers IF. His previous job was as assistant manager at Malmö FF, Gren was at the club from 2008 until he left in the preseason of 2010.

References

External sources
Malmö FF Profile

1957 births
Living people
Swedish footballers
Swedish football managers
GAIS managers
Association footballers not categorized by position
Footballers from Gothenburg